A dithiolane is a sulfur heterocycle derived from cyclopentane by replacing two methylene bridges (-- units) with thioether groups. The parent compounds are 1,2-dithiolane and 1,3-dithiolane.

1,2-Dithiolanes are cyclic disulfides. Some dithiolanes are natural products
that can be found in foods, such as asparagusic acid in asparagus. The 4-dimethylamino derivative nereistoxin was the inspiration for insecticides which act by blocking the nicotinic acetylcholine receptor.
Lipoic acid is essential for aerobic metabolism in mammals and also has strong affinity with many metals including gold, molybdenum, and tungsten. Other 1,2-dithiolanes have relevance in nanomaterials such as gold nanoparticles or transition metal dichalcogenide monolayers (TMDs) (MoS2 and WS2).

1,3-Dithiolanes are important as protecting groups for carbonyl compounds, since they are inert to a wide range of conditions. Reacting a carbonyl group with 1,2-ethanedithiol converts it to a 1,3-dithiolane, as detailed below.

References

External links

1,3-Dithiolane Reactions